Jerome Kohlberg Jr. (July 10, 1925 – July 30, 2015) was an American businessman and investor. He was an early pioneer in the private equity and leveraged buyout industries founding private equity firm Kohlberg Kravis Roberts & Co. and later Kohlberg & Company.

Early life and education
Kohlberg was raised in a Jewish family graduating from New Rochelle High School in New Rochelle, New York. Kohlberg served in the United States Navy during World War II and went on to college and graduate school on the GI Bill. He earned an undergraduate degree from Swarthmore College. He later received an MBA from Harvard Business School and an LLB from Columbia Law School. In 1986, he founded the Philip Evans Scholarship Foundation at Swarthmore.

Career

Kohlberg Kravis Roberts & Co.
Kohlberg joined Bear Stearns in 1955 where he would go on to manage the corporate finance department.  Working for Bear Stearns in the late 1960s and early 1970s, Kohlberg, alongside Bear Stearns executives began advising a series of what they described as "bootstrap" investments.  Their acquisition of Orkin Exterminating Company in 1964 is considered to have been among the first significant leveraged buyout transactions. In the following years the three Bear Stearns bankers would complete a series of buyouts including Stern Metals (1965), Incom (a division of Rockwood International, 1971), Cobblers Industries (1971), and Boren Clay (1973) as well as Thompson Wire, Eagle Motors and Barrows through their investment in Stern Metals.  Although they had a number of highly successful investments, the $27 million investment in Cobblers ended in bankruptcy.  Kravis and his associates created a series of limited partnerships to acquire these various corporations, ones they judged were performing well below their sales and profit potential or where there were untapped financial assets that could be monetized.  In most cases, Kohlberg Kravis Roberts & Co put up ten percent of the acquisition price from its own funds and borrowed the rest from investors by issuing high-yield bonds.

By 1976 tensions had built up between Bear Stearns and the trio of Kohlberg, Kravis and Roberts leading to their departure and the formation of Kohlberg Kravis Roberts in that year.  Most notably, Bear Stearns executive Cy Lewis had rejected repeated proposals to form a dedicated investment fund within Bear Stearns and Lewis took exception to the amount of time spent on outside activities.  Early investors in KKR included the Hillman Family Group of Henry Hillman and the Hillman Company.  By 1978, with the revision of the ERISA regulations, the nascent KKR was successful in raising its first institutional fund with approximately $30 million of investor commitments.

Kohlberg & Company

In 1987 Kohlberg resigned from KKR over differences in strategy and Henry Kravis and George Roberts assumed full leadership of the firm. Kohlberg did not favor the large buyouts (which would likely have included the 1989 takeover of RJR Nabisco) or hostile takeovers.  Instead, Kohlberg chose to return to his roots, acquiring smaller, middle-market companies and, in 1987, founded a new private equity firm Kohlberg & Company.  As of the end of 2007 Kohlberg & Company had raised six private equity funds since its inception, with approximately $3.7 billion of investor commitments.  Additionally, Kohlberg also operated a series of debt investment funds under the banner of Katonah Debt Advisors, as well as a publicly traded investment vehicle Kohlberg Capital (NASDAQ:KCAP). Kohlberg retired from Kohlberg & Company in 1994.

Kohlberg died of cancer on July 30, 2015, on Martha’s Vineyard in Massachusetts, twenty days after his 90th birthday.

Philanthropy

Kohlberg participated in philanthropy through the Kohlberg Foundation.

See also
List of billionaires
History of private equity and venture capital

References

External links
Kohlberg Foundation
Forbes.com: Forbes World's Richest People (2004)
Kohlberg's entry on Forbes 2006 list

1925 births
2015 deaths
20th-century American businesspeople
21st-century American businesspeople
American billionaires
American chairpersons of corporations
American chief executives of financial services companies
American financial company founders
American financiers
American investors
American money managers
Bear Stearns people
Businesspeople from New Rochelle, New York
Columbia Law School alumni
Harvard Business School alumni
Jewish American philanthropists
Kohlberg Kravis Roberts
Philanthropists from New York (state)
Private equity and venture capital investors
Swarthmore College alumni
20th-century American philanthropists
United States Navy personnel of World War II
Deaths from cancer in Massachusetts
21st-century American Jews
New Rochelle High School alumni